The Basilica of San Fedele in Como is located in the city center and is dedicated to Saint Fidelis martyr. It derives from an earlier Christian church, dating from the seventh century, dedicated to Euphemia.

Architecture 
The present church dates from 1120, the building is Romanesque, and not only; the original three naves irregular grafted onto a central plant, also irregular due to the smaller size compared to the two main apse of the transept. In the back there is a barrel vault in the nave with bone-arched pediment. The restoration of Antonio Giussani altered the facade (1914) and bell tower (1905). Farm use of Roman pieces are carved above the door back in Romanesque capitals and adapted to ambulatory font north of lion terrier.

External

Facade 
The neo-Romanesque facade of San Fedele, rebuilt from scratch in 1914, has a central Rose window.

Bell tower 
Probably built at the same time that the basilica, had collapsed in the earthquake of 3 January 1117. It was rebuilt in 1271. It tilted over the years, so it was demolished in 1905 to a height of m. 11.90 and then rebuilt.

Portal 
At the outside there are interesting details like the central apse polygonal three-story crowned by loggia from the thirteenth century. and flanked by the ancient pointed portal dating from the eleventh and twelfth centuries, also called portal of the dragon with medieval bas-relief.. According to the most common hypothesis is represented prophet Habakkuk with baskets of food he brought for St. Daniel, and below it is a carved relief of Romanesque depicting "Daniel on the throne in the lions' den."

Plan of the basilica 

  1. Ark Gothic Saint Fidelis of 1365;
  2. Votive frescoes (thirteenth-fourteenth centuries);
  3. Chapel of the Crucifix;
  4. Chapel of Mary;
  5. Altar of suffrage;
  6. Chapel of Innocent XI;
  7. Chapel of Mary of the Snow;
  8. Paintings and sculptures of the seventeenth and eighteenth centuries.

The interior has three naves and three apses presbytery, covered by a dome and surrounded by an ambulatory.

Along the ambulatory, there are medieval votive frescoes.

In the chapel of the Crucifix, there is an impressive marble altar contains the crucifix in papier-mâché painted on the apse by Isidoro Bianchi in 1623. God the Father and the risen Christ dominate the center of three circles. In the first circle appear some holy (Orsola, Marta, Apollonia, Catherine, Agatha, Cecilia) accompanied by S. Peter Martyr, and other saints. In the second are grouped saints, bishops and popes (Vincenzo, Lorenzo, Sebastian, Carlo Borromeo, Bernard, and others). In the third we find a host of angels and archangels. Four paintings with scenes of the Passion painted by Carlo Innocenzo Carloni of Scaria complete the decoration of the chapel located at the end of the south aisle.

At the end of the north aisle, there is the chapel of the Blessed Virgin Purified represented by a seventeenth-century statue in gilded wood. The bowl is painted with frescoes of the Assumption of the Virgin attributed to the painter Domenico Caresana and Francesco Carpano. At the sides of the altarpiece there are four seventeenth-century frescoes of the Marriage of the Virgin, the Nativity, the Annunciation to the Shepherds and the Adoration of the Magi.

The first chapel on the right has different characteristics from the others. The ceiling is lined with baroque stucco, and on the wall there is a triptych painted in 1504 by Giovanni Andrea De Magistris representing Mary with Child between Saints Sebastian and Rocco; below there is an urn which contained the remains (now venerated in the Church of "Jesus") of sant'Amanzio bishop of Como.

Images

See also
 History of medieval Arabic and Western European domes

References

 http://www.diocesidicomo.it/como/s2magazine/index1.jsp?idPagina=22879
 http://www.parrocchiasanfedelecomo.it

External links 

 official site

Basilica churches in Lombardy
Churches in the province of Como
7th-century churches in Italy